Ferrero Marianetti (28 May 1912 – 1970) was an Italian diver. He was born in Rome. He competed at the 1936 Summer Olympics in Berlin, where he placed 17th in 10 metre platform.

References

External links

1912 births
1970 deaths
Divers from Rome
Italian male divers
Olympic divers of Italy
Divers at the 1936 Summer Olympics
Place of death missing